Nice Collective is a San Francisco-based designer clothing brand founded in 1997. Dance music veterans Joe Haller and Ian Hannula took the silhouettes, energy and attitude of the streetwear they themselves wore and loved and combined these with better fabrics and quality construction. Though their focus is on menswear, the designers also produce collections for women as well.

Background

Joe Haller was raised in New York and into his 20s worked as a radiology tech. During his off hours, he produced dance music and organized parties in clubs around New York City. A professional bike racer, Ian Hannula was raised in Atlanta, Georgia and studied combat photography in the Marine Corps. He created dance music events in Atlanta and was a resident DJ in two top clubs. Joe and Ian met on the dance floor in San Francisco in 1995. Their connection was instant, fueled by their common interests in art, music, and fashion. They initially started Nice Collective as loose amalgamation of talent that would launch parties and club nights, a record label, a DJ agency, and a clothing line. Though neither had any fashion training, Haller and Hannula began by producing experimental pieces such as deconstructed than reconstructed camouflage shirts, pullover sweaters made from electric blankets with the controls still attached, and shirts that transformed into kites.

Public profile

In February 2010, Haller and Hannula collaborated with environmentalist David de Rothschild's Plastiki launch – a boat made from discarded plastic water bottles that set sail from San Francisco to Australia – designing interiors and clothing for the crew from old military blankets and tents.

GQ Magazine featured Nice Collective in its roundup of 'The Best New Designers in America' in 2007.

Nice Collective has outfitted tours for Coldplay, Nine Inch Nails, Smashing Pumpkins and The Police. The line's celebrity following includes Robert Pattinson,  Gavin Rossdale and Brad Pitt.

Nice Collective returned to New York Fashion Week – after a 13-year absence – in February 2009 with the "Time Machine" collections.  "There was certainly something post apocalyptic--not to mention post-erotic--about the clothes," said New York fashion writer Josh Peskowitz of men.style.com.

Collection history

 Fall 2010 - "Voices"
 Spring 2010 - "The Gathering"
 Fall 2009 - "Time Machine"
 Spring 2009 - "Voix de Ville"   
 Fall 2008 - "New Romantics"

References

Clothing brands of the United States